The Chair in Transgender Studies is the world's first research chair focusing on the study of transgender individuals, issues, and history. It is housed at the University of Victoria, located in Victoria, British Columbia. Unlike any other university department chair at the University of Victoria, the Chair in Transgender Studies is self-funded through philanthropy and private donations. The Chair is unique in that it does not grant degrees, but instead works with both community and academic communities to further the advancement of transgender studies. Dr Aaron Devor, the inaugural and current Chair, works with researchers, community members, academics, and advocates to advance the study of trans scholarship. The Chair focuses on four pillars: original research, continued scholarship, maintenance and growth of the Transgender Archives, and organization of Canada’s largest international transgender conference, Moving Trans History Forward.

History  
Established in 2016, the Chair in Transgender Studies was the recipient of a $1 million donation from the Tawani Foundation to aid in its creation and growth.   The Tawani foundation, created by retired US Army Veteran Jennifer Pritzker matched donations to the Chair up to $1 million. The inaugural and current Chair is Dr Aaron Devor, a professor of sociology and former dean of Graduate Studies at the University of Victoria. Dr Devor is also the founder and Academic Director of the Transgender Archives, which is housed at the University of Victoria.

Programming and Activities

Research and Scholarship 

In order to support continued research on trans-related issues and history, the Chair offers scholarships and fellowships for researchers of trans issues, and for self-identified Trans, Nonbinary, Two Spirit, and other gender nonconforming individuals studying any topic. Though many of the awards are scholarships for academic researchers and students, the Chair does not limit its funding to only those within academia, offering fellowships to support members of the community who are involved in trans activism and education. 

The Chair hosts a public lecture series featuring speakers from various scholarly backgrounds for, by, and about Trans, Nonbinary, Two Spirit and other gender nonconforming individuals. Notable speakers who have given talks include researcher and professor Susan Stryker and web-comic artist Sophie Labelle.

Transgender Archives 

The Transgender Archives is located at the University of Victoria Libraries, Special Collections, and Archive. Established in 2012 by Aaron Devor and archivist Lara Wilson, it is the largest collection of trans specific material in the world. The collection spans over 160 meters (530 ft), goes back over 120 years, and is in 15 languages from 23 countries on 6 continents. The archive is open to the public, free of charge.

Moving Trans History Forward conferences 

Moving Trans History Forward is a series of international conferences held bi-yearly in Victoria, BC. It is founded and organized by the Chair in Transgender Studies and the Academic Director of the Transgender Archive. The first conference was held on March 21-23rd 2014, the second on March 17-20nd 2016, and the third on March 22-25th 2018 at the University of Victoria campus. The 2020 conference was postponed to March 11-14th 2021 and will be held online.

The conferences aims to create an inclusive platform for individuals to learn about trans history and activism, as well as explore new findings in trans research and the variety of issues that impact Trans, Nonbinary, Two-Spirit, and other gender-nonconforming people across the world. The conference is not strictly academic, offering presentations by community members, artists, and activists, as well as being open to the public. Moving Trans History Forward is one of the largest conferences of its kind in North America, bringing in upwards of 300 participants in 2018.

References 

Gender studies
Universities and colleges in Canada
Transgender studies